The Andean passport is a passport for South American countries that are members of the Andean Community of Nations (ACN).

Origin and use

The Andean passport was created in June 2001 pursuant to ACN Decisión 504. This passport is based on a standard model containing harmonised features of nomenclature and security based on the recommendations of the International Civil Aviation Organization (ICAO). The member states of the ACN agreed to phase in new Andean passports bearing the official name of the regional body in Spanish by January 2005, although previously issued national passports will be valid until their expiry date.

The passport is effective in Bolivia, Ecuador, Peru and formerly, in Venezuela. Because Venezuela left the ACN in 2006, the country no longer issues Andean passports, and it is most likely to start issuing a new MERCOSUR-style passport as the country became a full member of that organization. Venezuelan ACN passports issued are valid until its expiration date. The last Venezuelan ACN passports were more likely to expire between 2011 and 2012.

Basic features
The Andean passport features:
 a cover and back cover in “bordeaux” color.
 legends printed in gold color.
 Above the national seal of the issuing country, the cover has the legend "COMUNIDAD ANDINA", which is centered and printed in larger fonts. Below the seal is printed the official name of the member country.
 the bottom of the cover has the word "PASAPORTE" (Spanish), with "PASSPORT" (English) immediately below in smaller type.

Gallery of Andean passports

External links

DECISION 525: Minimum specific technical characteristics of Andean Passport nomenclature and security

Passports
Andean Community
2001 establishments in South America
Foreign relations of Bolivia
Foreign relations of Colombia
Foreign relations of Ecuador
Foreign relations of Peru